Antipodochlora braueri (Dusk dragonfly) is a species of dragonfly in the family Corduliidae. It is endemic to New Zealand. Its natural habitat is rivers.

References

Odonata of New Zealand
Corduliidae
Insects described in 1871
Taxonomy articles created by Polbot